The British Rail Class 360 Desiro is an electric multiple-unit class that was built by Siemens Transportation Systems between 2002 and 2005. The Class 360 is currently operated by East Midlands Railway and the Global Centre of Rail Excellence.

Description

Class 360/1

First Great Eastern ordered 21 four-car Class 360/1s to replace its slam-door Class 312 units. Built in Krefeld, Germany, the units feature air conditioning, plug doors, CCTV, a wheelchair area, and first class at the cab ends. After being tested at the Wildenrath, Germany and Velim, Czech Republic test tracks, the first entered service in August 2003. In February 2004, unit 360115 returned to Wildenrath for tests aimed at improving pantograph performance.

They were primarily used on Great Eastern Main Line services from London Liverpool Street to Clacton-on-Sea, Colchester Town and Ipswich. They also ran to Walton-on-the-Naze and the Mayflower line. They occasionally operated through to Norwich.

In April 2004, the Great Eastern franchise was merged into the Greater Anglia franchise that was awarded to National Express East Anglia. All passed with the franchise to Greater Anglia in February 2012. The Class 360s were not maintained by the franchisee, but under contract by Siemens at Ilford EMU Depot.

All were replaced by Class 720s in 2020/2021 and moved to East Midlands Railway (EMR) to operate services on the Midland Main Line from London St Pancras to Corby from May 2021. They will be based at Bedford Cauldwell Walk depot.

Beginning in June 2020, all were cycled through Siemens at Kings Heath Depot, Northampton to be modified for  operation. The first was transferred to EMR's Cricklewood Depot in November 2020, with all having transferred by February 2021.

They entered service with East Midlands Railway on 16 May 2021. Two units had received a temporary application of the EMR Connect livery in time for this; full-scale repainting of the fleet began in June 2021.

Class 360/2

In June 2003, BAA plc ordered four Class 360 units for its Heathrow Connect service, which was designed to complement the non-stop Heathrow Express service by calling at a number of intermediate stations between London Paddington to Heathrow Airport. Siemens fulfilled the order by rebuilding four  units it had previously built in speculation of an order from Angel Trains. One of these, 350001, had already been delivered to England and was being used for training by South West Trains at Northam Carriage Servicing Depot, while the others remained at the Wildenrath test track in Germany.

The first rebuilt unit arrived at Heathrow Connect's Old Oak Common depot in November 2004, and services commenced in June 2005. An additional unit was subsequently ordered; it arrived in England in November 2005 but did not enter service for a further 12 months. In 2007 five additional intermediate vehicles were procured and used to lengthen each unit to five carriages. In 2010, one unit began operating a Heathrow Central to Heathrow Terminal 4 shuttle, with a new Heathrow Express livery. In May 2018 TfL Rail inherited all five of Heathrow Connect's Class 360s, which were replaced by Class 345 units once problems with the European Train Control System in the Heathrow tunnel were resolved. On 30 July 2020, Class 345 units began entering passenger service on the Heathrow branch, and the last Class 360 units were withdrawn on 13 September 2020.

In February 2021, Rail Operations Group (ROG) announced it had purchased the five-strong fleet from Heathrow Airport Holdings. The fleet was moved to MoD Bicester for storage pending further use with the company, which potentially included conversion into "fast freight" units. In August 2022, ROG stated that the units would not be repurposed due to technical issues, and that they wished the units to return to passenger service. However, this did not occur, and on 23 August 2022 unit 360205 was taken to Sims Metal in Newport, South Wales, to be scrapped. Unit 360204 followed shortly thereafter.

In October 2022, it was announced that the remaining three units had been acquired by the Global Centre of Rail Excellence (GCRE). The units will be used in the running-in process for the GCRE's infrastructure test track, as well as being made available to the railway industry as research and development test trains.

Accidents and incidents
 On 25 May 2014, 360205 derailed as it entered  due to bogie maintenance errors, exacerbated by a track defect.

Fleet details

References

360
Siemens multiple units
Train-related introductions in 2003
25 kV AC multiple units